Theater 't Speelhuis was a theatre in Helmond, the Netherlands.

The theatre was designed by Piet Blom, who also designed the cube houses in Helmond and in Rotterdam. It was opened in October 1977 by then Crown Princess Beatrix.

The theatre was completely destroyed by fire on 29 December 2011. The building was a municipal monument, not a Rijksmonument, as was wrongly reported by several media.

Gallery

References

External links
 
 Virtual tour of the theatre as it was

Speelhuis
Buildings and structures in North Brabant
Helmond